The Electricity Association (EA) was an association of major electricity companies in the United Kingdom.

It closed on 30 September 2003, and its services were replaced by three other industry bodies:
 Association of Electricity Producers
 Energy Networks Association
 Energy Retail Association

See also
Energy Networks Association Document Catalogue, includes documents of the former Electricity Association

References 

Business organisations based in the United Kingdom